Seven Mile Island or Seven Mile Beach is the name of a barrier island on the Jersey Shore in Cape May County, New Jersey, United States. It is divided between the boroughs of Avalon to the north, from 6th to 80th Streets, and Stone Harbor to the south, from 80th Street to Hereford Inlet.

Known as Leaming's Island in 1722, when the first purchase of its  was recorded, its dunes, woodlands and beaches were purchased for the equivalent of $380.

Geography
Seven Mile Island is a barrier island along the Atlantic Ocean between Townsends Inlet on the northeast, and Hereford Inlet on the southwest. An expanse of salt marsh and tidal channels separates Seven Mile Island from Great Sound, Jenkins Sound, and the mainland.

Seven Mile Island was described in 1834 as,

An 1878 description of Seven Mile Island is as follows, viz,

References

Barrier islands of New Jersey
Landforms of Cape May County, New Jersey
Islands of New Jersey